Catacombs of the Bear Cult is a 1981 role-playing game adventure for Tunnels & Trolls published by Flying Buffalo.

Plot summary 
Catacombs of the Bear Cult is an adventure in which cultists keep sweeping down from the hills and robbing the caravans on the Great Highway, so the Death Empress put a price on their heads, and the player characters are out in the wilderness looking for the headquarters of the Great Bear Cult.

Reception 
W.G. Armintrout reviewed Catacombs of the Bear Cult in The Space Gamer No. 54. Armintrout commented that "If you play T&T, buy this.  If you don't – well, this and the rulebook would be a good place to start!"

References 

Role-playing game supplements introduced in 1981
Tunnels & Trolls adventures